A monopole (French for 'monopoly') is an area controlled by a single winery (wine company) and can be as small as a named vineyard (lieu-dit) or as large as an entire appellation d'origine contrôlée (AOC). Frequently this is mentioned on the label as it is rare for only one winery to produce all the wine from an area entitled to a certain name. Each wine is sold by only one company.

The Napoleonic inheritance laws typically caused vineyards to be so finely divided among inheritors -down to even a single row of vines- that négociants are needed to bottle commercial quantities of a wine. Whether a monopole indicates a wine of unusual quality or not is a matter of debate.

List of monopoles (in need of expansion)
In Burgundy:

Others
Château-Grillet AOC, of Château Grillet.
Savennières-Coulée-de-Serrant, owned by Nicolas Joly.

See also
Vineyard designated wine

References

Wine terminology